Tormead School is an independent day school for girls aged 4–18 years old in Guildford, Surrey, England. It comprises a reception, prep school, senior school and sixth form. It was founded in 1905 and is a member of the Headmasters' and Headmistresses' Conference (HMC) and Girls Schools Association (GSA).

History
Tormead School was founded in 1905 in a residential area of Guildford. Starting with a mere handful of girls and a teacher in a private house, the school survived the threat of a takeover in 1912 and near financial collapse in 1935. Tormead survived these vicissitudes to grow in size during the two World Wars, led by a succession of Headmistresses. David Boyd, the current Head, is the first male Headteacher of Tormead since the school's inception.

Additions to the building include Alleyne House in the Junior School (named after former headmistress, Honor Alleyne), the science wing, and specialist design technology, home economics and textiles rooms. In 2008, construction was completed on a new performing arts centre.

In 2015 the most recent developments took place, with the addition of a new atrium to the old school house and a refit of all the classroom facilities and library.

Extra-curricular activities
Particular sporting activities at the school include swimming (a number of students compete at both national and international level), gymnastics (the school has previously won the European Championships for Schools, GISGA) and fencing (the school competes nationally and some members of the squad represent Great Britain internationally).

The school has a Music Department. Four orchestras and four choirs operate within the school, as well a Jazz Band, which tours Europe during the summer every two years and has played at numerous events and locations. The school has held musical events to celebrate its 90-year anniversary, the turn of the millennium and its centenary. Formal music events are arranged throughout the school year, with male singers for vocal performances often "borrowed" from the Royal Grammar School, Guildford.

Other extra-curricular activities of note are Young Enterprise, Young Consumer, The Duke of Edinburgh's Award, public speaking and debating. The debating squad frequently enter the Cambridge, Oxford and Mace debating competitions. In 2009, they also were picked as one of the first schools in Britain to take part in the YPI project (Youth Philanthropy Initiative).

Notable former pupils

The school has an active alumnae association, TOGA, the Tormead Old Girls' Association and Parents' Association.
Andrea Byrne, ITV newsreader
Emma Dodd, illustrator
Lorna Hutson, academic
Riva Taylor, singer
Sandi Toksvig, comedian

References

External links
 

Private schools in Surrey
Educational institutions established in 1905
Girls' schools in Surrey
1905 establishments in England
Schools in Guildford